Kipchoge: The Last Milestone is a 2021 British documentary film directed by Jake Scott and executive produced by Ridley Scott. It follows Kenyan athlete Eliud Kipchoge and the events leading up to the Ineos 1:59 Challenge that saw him breaking the two-hour mark for running the marathon distance. The film was released digitally on-demand on 24 August 2021.

Production
The film was directed by Jake Scott, produced by Ross Plummer and executive produced by Kai-Lu Hsiung, Kevin Macdonald, and Ridley Scott.

Critical reception
Outside reviewer Martin Fritz Huber wrote that the "learnt nothing new" from the film, but praised its "irresistible" cinematography. Rob Aldam of Backseat Mafia described the film as a "fascinating journey following a man fully-focussed on one goal and the huge support team dedicated to making it all possible".

References

External links
 
 
 
 

Films directed by Jake Scott (director)
2021 documentary films
2021 films
British documentary films
2020s English-language films
2020s British films